The Karauridae are a family of stem-group salamanders (Caudata) that are known from the Middle Jurassic to Late Jurassic in Central Asia (Kazakhstan and Kyrgyzstan) and Western Europe (United Kingdom). The family includes three members: Karaurus from the Middle-Late Jurassic Karabastau Formation of Kazakhstan, Kokartus from the Middle Jurassic Balabansai Formation of Kyrgyzstan, and Marmorerpeton from the Middle Jurassic Forest Marble Formation of England and Kilmaluag Formation of Scotland. The members are some of the oldest known salamanders. The family is united by several morphological characters, including sculptured skull roof bones. Like some modern salamanders, karaurids were neotenic. Members of the family likely fed via suction feeding on small fish and invertebrates.

References

External links 
Tetrapod Zoology article on Karaurids and other early Caudatans

Prehistoric amphibian families
Bathonian first appearances
Late Jurassic extinctions
Fossil taxa described in 1978